Scott Lawrence (born October 8, 1975) is an American rugby union coach and former player who currently serves as the interim head coach for the United States national rugby union team. He previously coached Rugby ATL in Major League Rugby (MLR) from 2020 to 2022.

Professional rugby career

Playing career

Before picking up coaching, Lawrence played as a flanker. 

Lawrence entered as a substitute for the USA "A" squad against Scotland in 2002, a non capped match. 

Lawrence was called into the U.S. squad for the 2006 Churchill Cup; he didn't play the first two matches, but received his first cap in the team's final match against Canada. 

He played five matches for the U.S. national team in 2006 as a loose forward, starting three games.

Coaching career
Lawrence coached the United States under-20 national team at the 2011 and 2012 Junior World Rugby Trophy, leading the team to victory in the 2012 tournament. Lawrence then worked as Life University head coach where he led the team to a D1A national championship. Lawrence joined the U.S. national team as an assistant coach in May 2017. Scott Lawrence became the U.S. national teams interim head coach on January 5th, 2023 after Gary Gold failed to get the United States national rugby union team to qualify for the 2023 Rugby World Cup. 

References:9.^ https://www.americasrugbynews.com/2023/01/05/usa-rugby-names-interim-eagles-coaches/, Americas Rugby News. January 5, 2023

Living people
1975 births
American rugby union coaches
United States international rugby union players
Rugby union flankers